"I Wouldn't Be a Man" is a song written by Mike Reid and Rory Bourke. Originally recorded by Don Williams, it has also been covered by Billy Dean and Josh Turner. Williams's version of the song was a Top Ten country hit in late 1987–early 1988, while versions by Dean and Turner also charted.

Don Williams version
Williams' version of the song appears on his 1987 album Traces for Capitol Records. It was released as a single in October of that year and his version peaked at number nine on the Hot Country Singles (now Hot Country Songs) charts published by Billboard, and number seven on the Canadian country music charts published by RPM.

Chart positions

Billy Dean version

Billy Dean recorded the song for his 1996 album It's What I Do, also released through Capitol Records. His version of the song was the third single from it, spending fourteen weeks on the country charts and peaking at number 45 by January 1997.

Background
In October 1996, Dean told Billboard magazine that he chose to cut the song because he thought that it was different from the material that he had cut before; he called it a "one-on-one, man-to-woman song". He recorded the vocals in one take. He also said that he had heard Mike Reid, the original co-writer, sing it and it "knocked [him] out". Richard Murray directed the video for Dean's version.

Critical reception
Deborah Evans Price, of Billboard magazine reviewed the song favorably, saying that the tune boasts a "romantic lyric and wistful melody." She goes on to call Dean's rendition "bluesier" than Williams' "straight-ahead country cut." She says that while it is impossible to top Williams' original "sensitive rendering", Dean manages to do a "more-than-adequate job" of bringing the song back to life.

Music video
The music video was directed by Richard Murray and premiered in late 1996.

Chart positions
"I Wouldn't Be a Man" debuted at number 69 on the U.S. Billboard Hot Country Singles & Tracks for the week of November 2, 1996.

Josh Turner version

In late September 2010, Universal Music Group Nashville announced that Josh Turner's version of the song would be the third single from his album Haywire. He began filming the music video for it on September 27, 2010, under the direction of Peter Zavadil. The song debuted at number 56 on the U.S. Billboard Hot Country Songs chart the week of November 13, 2010.

Critical reception
Juli Thanki of Engine 145 thought that Turner's rendition of the song sounded like he was "phoning it in". Bobby Peacock of Roughstock rated it 4 stars out of 5, saying that Turner "finds the right balance of emotions". He also thought that it was better than both Williams' and Dean's versions.

Music video
The music video was directed by Peter Zavadil and premiered in late 2010.

Chart positions

Year-end charts

Certifications

References

1987 singles
1996 singles
2010 singles
Don Williams songs
Billy Dean songs
Josh Turner songs
Songs written by Mike Reid (singer)
Songs written by Rory Bourke
Music videos directed by Peter Zavadil
Song recordings produced by Garth Fundis
Song recordings produced by Tom Shapiro
Song recordings produced by Frank Rogers (record producer)
Capitol Records Nashville singles
MCA Nashville Records singles
Country ballads
1987 songs